Kuchaikote (community development block) is one of the administrative divisions of Gopalganj district in the Indian state of  Bihar.

Geography
Kuchaikote is located at

Panchayats
The panchayats in the Kuchaikote community development block are Pokharvinda, Kuchaikote, Sherpur, Belbanwa Parsoni Pandey, Mateya Khas, Bantail, Khajuri, Rampur Khareya and Bhoptapur.

Demographics
As per 2011 census, Kuchaikote block had a population of 332,041.

Economy

The economy of Kuchaikote is mainly based on agricultural products such as sugarcane, pulses, and grains. It is known for its advances in horticulture.

References

Community development blocks in Gopalganj district, India